Maradi III is an urban commune in Niger. It is a commune of the city of Maradi.

Geography 
Maradi III is situated at an altitude of 304 meters above sea level. The comune covers an area of 295 square kilometers, with an average population density of 361 people per square kilometer.

Climate 
The climate in Maradi III is classified as tropical savanna (Aw) according to the Köppen climate classification. The rainy season lasts from May to September, with average precipitation of 635 mm. The rest of the year is dry, with high temperatures and low humidity.

Economy 
The economy of Maradi III is primarily based on agriculture, with millet, sorghum, and cowpea being the main crops grown. The comune is also known for its cattle markets, which attract buyers from all over Niger and neighboring countries.

Education 
Maradi III has several primary schools, as well as a secondary school. The comune also has a vocational training center, which offers courses in agriculture, mechanics, and sewing.

Healthcare 
There is a health center in Maradi III, which provides basic healthcare services to the population. More specialized healthcare services are available in the nearby town of Maradi.

Transportation 
Maradi III is connected to the rest of the country by a paved road, which links it to the town of Maradi and the national capital, Niamey. There is also a weekly market, which attracts traders from neighboring towns and villages.

Culture 
Maradi III is known for its traditional dance, the Takamba. The dance is performed by men and women, accompanied by the sounds of the biram, a traditional stringed instrument. The comune also celebrates several festivals throughout the year, including Eid al-Fitr and Eid al-Adha.

References

Communes of Niger
Maradi, Niger